The Parent Trap may refer to:

Lisa and Lottie, a 1949 novel by Erich Kästner published in the United Kingdom and Australia since 2014 as The Parent Trap
 The Parent Trap, a series of films based on the novel
The Parent Trap (1961 film), the first installment of the series, starring Hayley Mills
 "The Parent Trap" (song), the title song from the 1961 film
 The Parent Trap (1998 film), a remake of the 1961 film starring Lindsay Lohan
 "The Parent Trap", a 1996 episode of Ellen
 "The Parent Trap", an episode of Static Shock